The Beaver State Fling (BSF) is an annual disc golf tournament held at Riverbend Disc Golf Course at Milo McIver State Park in Estacada, Oregon.

History
Originally created as part of the now defunct Oregon Series by Teresa Trueba Embree and Cris Bellinger, the Beaver State Fling was built up from its original C-Tier to a PDGA National Tour stop in 4 years.  By 2005, it was the 5th largest tournament in the world by attendance.  In 2010, spots filled up in 30 minutes and for the 2011 tournament new skill-level restrictions limited the number of professionals, while a lottery system was introduced for amateurs.

In 2020, the BSF was cancelled due to the COVID-19 pandemic.  The 2021 BSF was cancelled as well, due to a combination of winter storm damage and uncertainty around the state of the pandemic.

FPO Champions
In 2018, Catrina Allen overcame a 3 stroke deficit in the final round to defeat the 4 time World Champion (at the time) Paige Pierce in a 1 hole playoff.

MPO Champions
During the 2015 tournament, Paul McBeth made up a 4 stroke deficit going into the final round to force a sudden death playoff with Will Schusterick.  McBeth prevailed on the third hole of the playoff to claim his second BSF title.  In 2016, Philo Brathwaite carded a 2, or an albatross, on the 850-foot par 5 6th hole of the west course.  It is one of the most famous shots in disc golf history.  In 2019, Eagle McMahon fought off Seppo Paju to become just the third MPO player to win consecutive BSF titles.

References

External Links
 

Disc golf tournaments